Erica nana is a species of Erica heath native to the fynbos region of South Africa.

Description
Erica nana is a typical Cape heath, with small, fine needle-like leaves, a shrubby growth habit, and waxy yellow tubular flowers. It grows to about one metre in diameter and half that in height.

References

nana